The Ulen Sword is an artifact which was unearthed in a field  west of Ulen in Clay County, Minnesota. It is currently on display in the Ulen Museum which is operated by the Ulen Historical Society. At first purported to be a Viking sword by Norse coloniers, it bears little resemblance to any sword of known early Medieval provenance and is more probably a 19th-century military sword. Hjalmar Holand's book Pre-Columbian Crusade to America (1962) argues that the sword is authentic. Even though the validity of the sword is still debated it remains an important artifact in the town of Ulen. The Ulen Museums former name was the Viking Sword Museum. The sword was also mentioned in an America Unearthed episode.

The sword was found buried underground by Hans O. Hansen on his farm on April 20, 1911. Because of drought, Hansen decided to set his plow blades much deeper than usual, and unearthed the artifact. The blade of the Ulen sword is said to have had a -inch covering of rust, which Hansen polished away. The end of the sword has been blunted by a hammer or some other instrument. The pommel and the thick crossguard are made of brass. 
The sword's crossguard has a design on each side: one side depicts a helmeted soldier, and the reverse is a breastplate covering a dagger and two crossed axes.

References

Other sources
Rath, Jay; Elizabeth McBride; Chris Roerden (1998) The M-files: True Reports of Minnesota's Unexplained Phenomena (Big Earth Publishing)  
Oakeshott, R.E. (1996)  The Archaeology of Weapons, Arms and Armour from Prehistory to the Age of Chivalry (New York: Dover Publications Inc) .

External links
 Image of monument to the sword
Ulen Historical Society website
Modern European swords
Norse colonization of North America
1911 archaeological discoveries
Individual weapons